George Pavlou is a London-based British horror, science fiction and thriller film director.  Pavlou directed three feature films of which two were based on material from British horror writer Clive Barker.

Career
He began his career directing and producing short films for the cinema. His first short Bad Company (1980), about a dysfunctional Greek family, won the Special Prize for Young Cinema at Tours film festival. 

His second short film as director, The Antagonist (1981), was released theatrically through Rank Films as a support film to Educating Rita. The film starred Ed Bishop and Trevor Peacock.
 
He subsequently co produced a third short titled Chickens Never Walk backwards (1982), released by 20th Century Fox theatrically as a support to Conan the Barbarian.

Other feature films as associate producer include Nutcracker starring Joan Collins and the cinema short Expresso Splasho, directed by Terry Winsor, which supported the highly successful Eddie Murphy film Trading Places.

Subsequent work continued with a 26-part music television show One To One, hosted by Annie Nightingale and transmitted by London Weekend Television and a horror short for Channel Four titled Chillers broadcast in 1991.

Produced the children's television series titled Anything's Possible, transmitted by Channel Five television.

Pavlou embarked on creating his own film company directing and producing commercials, corporate films and documentaries from 1992 to the present day and recently executive produced a 90-minute bio documentary on Sid Vicious titled "Sid: By Those Who Knew Him" broadcast on Sky Arts channel 2009.

Features

Underworld (a.k.a. Transmutations) 
In 1985, Pavlou directed Transmutations (also known as Underworld) a science fiction horror thriller about a group of underground mutants called the Underworlders who live in the sewers of London and a deranged doctor who develops a mutation potion.  Pavlou met Clive Barker at a dinner party and asked him to write a screenplay (Barker's first) and "Underworld" emerged.  The film opened theatrically 
in some foreign territories but was predominantly a VHS and television release. Underworld was one of the first horror films to be chosen for the late night screenings of the 1985 London Film Festival. It was also selected for the Paris Cine Fantastique film festival. Empire Pictures, the USA distributor, retitled the film as Transmutations for the USA market.

Rawhead Rex

In 1986, Pavlou directed Rawhead Rex a horror film based on a short story written by Clive Barker.  Barker also wrote the screenplay. It was nominated in the international fantasy award Best Film category at the Fantasporto film festival (1987). The film was released theatrically in the USA through Empire Pictures as well as other foreign territories. The film performed better on DVD and television exploitation and is still broadcast by various channels around the world.
In October 2017 Kino Lorber released a 4K restored Blu-Ray and DVD in its original wide screen format in the USA and was the best-selling Horror film on Amazon Prime on its release. Rawhead also played theatrically in over thirty USA cities. The film was also released in the UK via Arrow Films.

Little Devils: The Birth

In 1993, Pavlou directed Little Devils: The Birth. The film was released in the US by New World and was predominantly exploited through DVD and television sales. The film was shot entirely in Canada as a comedy/horror film about a series of gargoyles who come to life. This iconic cult film was re-released in Canada by Shivers Entertainment in Canada in May 2017 as a limited edition DVD.

References

1953 births
Living people
Horror film directors
Film directors from London